"Imagination" is a song by Australian singer songwriter, Deni Hines. The song was released in February 1996 as the second single from her debut studio album, Imagination (1996). The single peaked at number 37 in Australia.

Track listing
 Australian Maxi single (D1285)
 "Imagination" (Original Version) - 4:08
 "Imagination"  (D-Influence Mix 1) - 4:31
 "Imagination"  (D-Influence Instrumental)	- 4:32
 "Imagination"  (D-Influence Dope Version) - 4:32

Charts

Credits
 Backing vocals – Chris Braide, Deni Hines
 Brass – Nigel Hitchcock, Steve Sidwell
 Drums, bass, keyboards [Fender Rhodes], guitar [Flamenco], programmed by – Ian Green
 Engineer – Tim Russell

References

External links
 Deni Hines "Imagination" at Discogs

1996 songs
1996 singles
Mushroom Records singles